"Eyes Wide Open" is a song by the American rock band Staind. It served as the second single from the band's self-titled seventh studio album Staind. The song was released on November 29, 2011. A music video which features live performances of Eyes Wide Open was released in 2012.

Track listing

Charts

Weekly charts

Year-end charts

References

2011 singles
2011 songs
Staind songs
Atlantic Records singles
Roadrunner Records singles
Songs written by Aaron Lewis
Song recordings produced by Johnny K
Songs written by Mike Mushok